Sympathy for Delicious is a 2010 drama film, and the directorial debut of Mark Ruffalo. Filming took place in Los Angeles.

Premise
A newly paralyzed disc jockey (Thornton) gets more than he bargained for when he seeks out the world of faith healing.

Cast
 Christopher Thornton as "Delicious' Dean O'Dwyer
 Juliette Lewis as Ariel Lee
 Mark Ruffalo as Joe
 Laura Linney as Nina Hogue
 Orlando Bloom as The Stain
 Noah Emmerich as Rene Faubacher
 John Carroll Lynch as Healer
 Robert Wisdom as Prendell
 Dov Tiefenbach as Oogie
 Deantoni Parks as Chuck
 Sandra Seacat as Mrs. Matilda

Awards
Ruffalo won the Special Jury Prize at the 2010 Sundance Film Festival, and was also nominated for the Grand Jury Prize.

Production
Filming took place in Los Angeles, California, from 5 January to 28 February 2009.

References

External links
 
 
 

2010 films
2010 drama films
American drama films
Films about paraplegics or quadriplegics
Films produced by Andrea Sperling
2010 directorial debut films
2010s English-language films
2010s American films